was a Japanese composer of contemporary classical music, and brother of composer Kan Ishii.

Biography
Born in Tokyo, Ishii studied composition privately (with Akira Ifukube and Tomojiro Ikenouchi) and conducting with Akeo Watanabe from 1952 to 1958 in Tokyo, then moved to Berlin, where he continued his studies under Boris Blacher and Josef Rufer. In 1962 he returned to Japan .

His music has been performed by the taiko group Kodo and he has composed for Japanese instruments as well as symphony orchestra and other Western instruments.

He died in Kashiwa, Chiba, Japan, at the Kashiwa National Cancer Center of thyroid cancer on April 8, 2003, at the age of 66.

Selected works
Orchestral Music
 Symphonic Poem GIOH, Op. 60. (1984); recorded 1988 DENON, The Contemporary Music of Japan, COCO-70960, Kyoto Symphony Orchestra, Koizumi, Kazuhiro conductor, Akao, Michiko, Yokobue, a typical Japanese Flute.
 Sō-Gū  II for Gagaku and Symphonic Orchestra, recorded 1971 Parlophone by the Gagaku Ensemble and the Japan Philharmonic Orchestra under Seiji Ozawa.

Sources
Funayama, Takashi. 1997. "Klänge zwischen Ost und West: Betrachtungen zu Maki Ishiis Fūshi", translated by Reinhold Quandt and Chris Drake. In Sei no hibiki, tō no hibiki: Ishii Maki no ongaku—Futatsu no sekai kara no sōzō/Westlicher Klang, östlicher Klang: Die Musik Maki Ishiis—Schöpfung aus zwei Musikwelten, edited by Christa Ishii-Meinecke, 118–49. Celle: Hermann Moeck. .
 
Kido, Toshirō. 1997. "Ikonologie der Klänge: Die Musik Maki Ishiis und das räumliche Konzept in der traditionellen japanischen Musik", translated by Robin Thompson and Christa Ishii-Meinecke. In Sei no hibiki, tō no hibiki: Ishii Maki no ongaku—Futatsu no sekai kara no sōzō/Westlicher Klang, östlicher Klang: Die Musik Maki Ishiis—Schöpfung aus zwei Musikwelten, edited by Christa Ishii-Meinecke, 180–225. Celle: Hermann Moeck. .
Mattner, Lothar. 1988. "Verharrende Zeit: Der Komponist Maki Ishii". Neue Zeitschrift für Musik 149, no. 11 (November): 19–22.
Sparrer, Walter-Wolfgang. 1999. "Buddhistisches und christliches, expressionistisches und bruitistisches: Zur deutschen Erstaufführung von Maki Ishiis Oper Das Schiff ohne Augen im Berliner Hebbel Theater". Neue Zeitschrift für Musik 160, no. 6 (November–December): 58.

Further reading

External links
Maki Ishii official site 
Maki Ishii official site 
Maki Ishii official site 
Maki Ishii former official site 

1936 births
2003 deaths
20th-century classical composers
20th-century Japanese composers
20th-century Japanese male musicians
Deaths from cancer in Japan
Deaths from thyroid cancer
Japanese classical composers
Japanese male classical composers
Musicians from Tokyo
Recipients of the Medal with Purple Ribbon